Basirat Nahibi or Basirat Nahibi-Niasse is a Nigerian politician, entrepreneur and the first female gubernatorial aspirant in Nigeria.

She is the founder of Women Advancement for Economic and Leadership in Africa (WAELE); a non-profit focused on empowering African women, economically and politically as well as ensuring their participation in peace and conflict transformation across 52 countries on the continent. She is also a founding member of the All Progressives Congress.

References

External links

Living people
Women in Lagos politics
Nigerian women activists
Year of birth missing (living people)
Place of birth missing (living people)
All Progressives Congress politicians